The Icy Strait is a strait in the Alexander Archipelago in southeastern Alaska, at about . The strait separates Chichagof Island to the south and the Alaska mainland to the north. The two largest islands in the strait are Pleasant Island and Lemesurier Island.

The Cape Spencer Light is an important former lighthouse and currently active aid-to-navigation.

The cruise ship Empress of the North ran aground near Rocky Island and took on some water here on May 14, 2007, causing the evacuation of its passengers. None were injured.

The nearby cruise ship destination Icy Strait Point is named in reference to it.

References

Straits of Alaska
Straits of the Pacific Ocean
Bodies of water of Haines Borough, Alaska
Bodies of water of Hoonah–Angoon Census Area, Alaska